Aleksei Kiselyov may refer to:
Aleksei Kiselyov (boxer) (1938–2005), Soviet Olympic boxer
Aleksei Kiselyov (politician) (1879–1937), Russian Soviet politician